Epizootiology, epizoology, or veterinary epidemiology is the study of disease patterns within animal populations.

See also
 Epizootic
 Epidemiology

References

Epidemiology
Veterinary medicine